Jimmy Garcia (October 12, 1971May 19, 1995) was a Colombian boxer who was best known for losing a WBC super featherweight title to Gabriel Ruelas and subsequently dying 13 days later from brain damage. The loss to Ruelas was the only stoppage loss of Garcia's career, and the former Colombian Featherweight champion's corner was criticized for not stopping the fight earlier. The Ruelas match had been Garcia's second unsuccessful title shot, having lost a unanimous decision to Genaro Hernández earlier.

Professional boxing record

References

External links

1971 births
1995 deaths
Featherweight boxers
Sportspeople from Barranquilla
Sports deaths in Nevada
Deaths due to injuries sustained in boxing
Colombian male boxers
20th-century Colombian people